Cixius is planthopper genus in the tribe Cixiini.

Species

 Cixius alpestris  Wagner, 1939 
 Cixius ariadne  Hoch & Asche, 1993 
 Cixius armatus  Ribaut, 1953 
 Cixius azofloresi  Remane & Asche, 1979 
 Cixius azomariae  Remane & Asche, 1979 
 Cixius azopicavus  Hoch, 1991 
 Cixius azopifajo  Remane & Asche, 1979 
 Cixius azoricus  Lindberg, 1954 
 Cixius azoterceirae  Remane & Asche, 1979 
 Cixius beieri  Wagner, 1939 
 Cixius caledonicus  China, 1942 
 Cixius cambricus  China, 1935 
 Cixius carniolicus  Wagner, 1939 
 Cixius cavazoricus  Hoch, 1991 
 Cixius chaoensis  China, 1938 
 Cixius crambiformis  Germar, 1830 
 Cixius cunicularius  (Linnaeus, 1767) 
 Cixius distinguendus  Kirschbaum, 1868 
 Cixius dubius  Wagner, 1939 
 Cixius granulatus  Horváth, 1897 
 Cixius heydenii  Kirschbaum, 1868 
 Cixius hispidus  Logvinenko, 1967 
 Cixius insularis  Lindberg, 1954 
 Cixius lineolatus  Ribaut, 1960 
 Cixius madeirensis  China, 1938 
 Cixius nervosus  (Linnaeus, 1758) 
 Cixius nycticolus  Hoch & Asche, 1993 
 Cixius ochraceus  Ribaut, 1953 
 Cixius pallipes  Fieber, 1876 
 Cixius palmensis  Lindberg, 1960 
 Cixius palmeros  Hoch & Asche, 1993 
 Cixius pascuorum  Ribaut, 1953 
 Cixius pinarcoladus  Hoch & Asche, 1993 
 Cixius ratonicus  Hoch & Asche, 1993 
 Cixius remotus  Edwards, 1888 
 Cixius rufofasciatus  Logvinenko, 1974 
 Cixius rufus  Logvinenko, 1969 
 Cixius sanctangeli  O.G. Costa, 1834 
 Cixius sibiricus  Emeljanov, 1979 
 Cixius sidnicus  Stål, 1859 
 Cixius similis  Kirschbaum, 1868 
 Cixius simplex  (Herrich-Schäffer, 1835) 
 Cixius sticticus  Rey, 1891 
 Cixius stigmaticus  (Germar, 1818) 
 Cixius tacandus  Hoch & Asche, 1993 
 Cixius trirhacoides  Remane & Holzinger, 1998 
 Cixius ukrainicus  Logvinenko, 1974 
 Cixius variabilis  Metcalf, 1936 
 Cixius verticalis  Noualhier, 1897 
 Cixius wagneri  China, 1942

References 

Auchenorrhyncha genera
Cixiini